Maglione may refer to:
Places
 Maglione, a commune (municipality) in Italian municipality in the Province of Turin
 Mount Maglione, a low mountain near Mount Ekblaw in the Clark Mountains, Marie Byrd Land

People
 Gerolamo Maglione, Italian politician of the 19th century
 Julio César Maglione, Uruguayan swimmer and member of the IOC
 Luigi Maglione, Italian cardinal

Fiction
 Gianna Maglione is a redirect to playwright  Penny Mickelbury